The Louisiana Jazz was a women's American football team in the Women's Football Alliance. They played their home games at St. Martin's Episcopal School.

History

New Orleans Spice
The New Orleans Spice women's football team was established in 2002 and played through the 2003 season in the National Women's Football Association. The team played at Tad Gormley Stadium and Pan American Stadium.

New Orleans Blaze
From 2004 to 2011, the team competed as the New Orleans Blaze in both the National Women's Football Association and Women's Football Alliance. The team played at Tad Gormley Stadium and Pan American Stadium.

References

External links
Louisiana Jazz official website
WFA official website

American football teams in New Orleans
Women's Football Alliance teams
American football teams established in 2002
American football teams disestablished in 2014
2002 establishments in Louisiana
2014 disestablishments in Louisiana
Women's sports in Louisiana